Celine Salim Al Haddad (born 12 March 2001) is a Lebanese footballer who plays as a defender for Lebanese club SAS and the Lebanon national team.

Club career 
Al Haddad played for Police Club in the Maldives between November and December 2021.

International career 
Al Haddad was called up to represent Lebanon at the 2022 WAFF Women's Championship, helping her side finish runners-up.

Honours 
SAS
 Lebanese Women's Football League: 2018–19, 2019–20, 2021–22
 Lebanese Women's FA Cup: 2018–19
 WAFF Women's Clubs Championship runner-up: 2019
 Lebanese Women's Super Cup runner-up: 2018

Lebanon
 WAFF Women's Championship runner-up: 2022; third place: 2019

See also
 List of Lebanon women's international footballers

References

External links

 
 
 

2001 births
Living people
People from Baabda District
Lebanese women's footballers
Lebanese women's futsal players
Women's association football defenders
Akhaa Ahli Aley FC (women) players
Stars Association for Sports players
Lebanese Women's Football League players
Lebanon women's youth international footballers
Lebanon women's international footballers
Lebanese women's expatriate futsal players
Lebanese expatriate sportspeople in the Maldives
Expatriate women's futsal players in the Maldives
21st-century Lebanese women